Thoyyeru is a village in Devipatnam Mandal, Alluri Sitharama Raju district in the state of Andhra Pradesh in India.

Geography 

Demographics 
 India census, Thoyyeru had a population of 1739, out of which 848 were male and 891 were female. The population of children below 6 years of age was 11%. The literacy rate of the village was 68%.

References 

Villages in Devipatnam mandal